Akçakaya (literally "quite white rock") is a Turkish place name that may refer to the following places in Turkey:

 Akçakaya, Altıeylül, a village
 Akçakaya, Çorum
 Akçakaya, Gölbaşı, a village in the district of Gölbaşı, Adıyaman Province
 Akçakaya, Söke, a village in the district of Söke, Aydın Province